Augusto Lobos (10 July 1912 – 19 April 1996) was a Chilean footballer. He played in three matches for the Chile national football team in 1939. He was also part of Chile's squad for the 1939 South American Championship.

References

External links
 

1912 births
1996 deaths
Chilean footballers
Chile international footballers
Place of birth missing
Association football goalkeepers
Santiago Morning footballers